The Le Normand de Bretteville family is a French Norman noble family. The family's original family name is Le Normand, but the family is sometimes known as only Bretteville in modern times, taking its name from its former lordship Bretteville-le-Rabet, a village in Normandy.

History

The family originates in Normandy, where they were lords of Bretteville, Trassepied, Bossy and Tertre. The family is first mentioned in 1470 with the Norman knight Jean Le Normand. Its noble status was confirmed by Norman courts on 3 July 1593, 11 February 1603 and 23 March 1629, and by French royal authorities on 2 July 1605, 7 February 1641 and 1 January 1699. Jacques Le Normand contracted the lordship of Bretteville in 1636 and the lordship was permanently ceded to the family in 1679.

Danish branch
Marquis Louis Claude le Normand de Bretteville (1744–1835) left France during the French Revolution, became a Danish Major-General and was naturalized as a Dano-Norwegian nobleman in 1804. He was married to Catherine-Thérèse Vedastine van den Driesch and has several descendants in Denmark and Norway. His third son, Charles Eugène le Normand de Bretteville (1782–1854), moved to Norway in 1799, and was the father of Prime Minister Christian Zetlitz Bretteville (1800–1871). Louis Claude's daughter Louise-Joséphine was a lady-in-waiting to Princess Wilhelmina Caroline of Denmark.

References

Norman families
French noble families
Danish noble families
Norwegian noble families
Danish families of French ancestry